The Constituent Cortes of 1820, formal title The General and Extraordinary Cortes of the Portuguese Nation, also frequently known as the Sovereign Congress or the Cortes Constituintes Vintistas, was the first modern Portuguese parliament. Created after the Liberal Revolution of 1820 to prepare a constitution for Portugal and its overseas territories, it used a different system from the traditional General Cortes for choosing representatives, and the three traditional feudal estates (Clergy, Nobility, and Commoners) no longer sat separately. The Cortes sat between January 24, 1821 and November 4, 1822 at the Palácio das Necessidades in Lisbon. The work of the Constitutional Cortes culminated in the approval of the Portuguese Constitution of 1822.

Elections
The government installed after the Oporto Revolution, known as the Provisional Junta of the Supreme Government of the Kingdom, decided to convene the Cortes and on September 1, 1820 set up a preparatory commission. On November 22, the Commission published instructions for the election of representatives to the Cortes, which were held in December 1820. The original instructions only provided for representatives from Portugal, ignoring Brazil and provoking great discontent. The instructions were then revised and re-issued in November, establishing the proportional representation that included in the overseas domains and abandoning the traditional division into three orders.

The electoral method chosen by the Commission was closely modelled on the electoral system Spain under the Spanish Constitution of 1812. It involved a complex process of indirect suffrage through the formation of parish, county, and provincial electoral committees. Male citizens over the age of 25 (in some cases over 21 years of age) with a job, a trade or useful occupation, elected an electoral college who, in turn, chose county voters. These then met in the provincial capitals and elected the representatives to the Cortes, with one representative for every 30,000 inhabitants.  Representatives were required to be at least 25 years of age. Despite the complexity of the process and inexperience of those operating it, the election was completed on Christmas Day 1820, with deputies elected in most provinces of Portugal. The remainder were elected in the following months.

These electoral criteria had the effect, in Brazil, of transforming the traditional captaincies into provinces.  The first Brazilian province to declare its adherence to the Cortes was Pará on 1 January 1821, followed on February 10 by Bahia, Piauí, Maranhão and Pernambuco. Other parts of Brazil followed in due course. Representatives from Sao Paulo, Paraíba, Pará, Espírito Santo, Goiás and Ceará only joined the Cortes in 1822. Representatives from Minas Gerais, Rio Grande do Norte, CIsplatina and Rio Grande do Sul did not take their seats in the Cortes, remaining in Brazil in demonstration of support to the regent Don Pedro. in total 97 representatives and alternates were elected from Brazil.

Drafting a constitution
On 9 March, less than three months after its opening meeting, the Cortes approved the "Bases of the Constitution", a document later sworn to by King John VI of Portugal on July 4 immediately after his return from exile in Brazil. Based on this document the Cortes then drafted and approved the first Portuguese Constitution, which was approved on September 30, 1822. The Cortes met for the last time on November 4, 1822. Although the constitution of 1822 only remained in effect for a short time, it served as an inspiration for Portuguese liberalism, and even influenced the first republican constitution of Portugal, approved almost a century later. On November 4, 1822, the work of the General and Extraordinary Cortes of the Portuguese Nation ended, and it became an ordinary assembly on November 15, 1822.

Divergence between Portugal and Brazil
In August 1821 the Cortes discussing a series of administrative measures to reorganize institutional power. Among other reforms the Cortes suppressed Brazil’s existing provincial governments and courts, and demanded the immediate return of the Prince Regent Dom Pedro to Lisbon. These discussions began before the Brazilian representatives arrived on August 29 and marked the beginning of a policy of confrontation between Lisbon and the regency of Dom Pedro. In addition trade relations between Brazil and Portugal became a point of divergence between deputies of the two kingdoms. To reconcile the different positions, in March 1822, a special commission of six Brazilian and six Portuguese representatives was established.

The Brazilian representatives wanted a dual monarchy with Portugal and Brazil as federated elements within a single empire, while the Portuguese representatives wanted a unitary state. The polarization between the two increased tension in the provinces, especially from January 1822 when Dom Pedro decided to stay in Brazil. On 4 May a decree of Dom Pedro established that no decision of the Cortes could be applied in Brazil without his assent. On September 23 and 24, the Political Constitution of the Portuguese Monarchy was signed by 39 of the 46 Brazilian deputies in office.

Representatives from Portugal in the Cortes
The following representatives took part in the debates:

Kingdom of the Algarve
Manoel José Placido da Sylva Negrão.
José Vaz Velho.
Jeronymo José Carneiro.

Minho Province

Francisco Wanzeller
Antonio Pereira
José Maria Xavier de Araujo
Francisco Xavier Calheiros
João de Sousa Pinto de Magalhães
José Ferreira Borges
Rodrigo Ribeiro Telles da Sylva
João Baptista Felgueiras
Basilio Alberto de Sousa
Archbishop da Bahia
João Pereira da Sylva
José Joaquim Rodrigues de Bastos
Joaquim José dos Santos Pinheira
Antonio Ribeiro da Costa
Manoel Martins Couto

Trás-os-Montes Province
Bernardo Corrêa de Castro e Sepulveda
Manoel Gonçalves de Miranda
Antonio Lobo de Barbosa Teixeira Ferreira Girão

Beira Province

José Maria de Sousa e Almeida
José de Gouvêa Osorio
Antonio Pinheiro d'Azevedo e Sylva
Baron de Molellos
José Pedro da Costa Ribeiro Teixeira
José de Mello de Castro e Abreu
Bishop de Lamego
João de Figueiredo
José Joaquim de Faria
José Ribeiro Saraiva
Antonio José Ferreira de Sousa
Pedro José Lopes d'Almeida
Manoel Fernandes Thomaz
José Joaquim Ferreira de Moura
Antonio Maria Osorio Cabral
Thomé Rodrigues Sobral
Manoel de Serpa Machado

Alentejo Province

Carlos Honorio de Gouvêa Durão
João Vicente da Sylva
Joaquim Annes de Carvalho
João Rodrigues de Brito
José Victorino Barreto Feyo
Ignacio da Costa Brandão
José Antonio da Rosa

Estremadura Province

Bento Pereira do Carmo
Francisco de Lemos Bittencourt
Agostinho José Freire
Luiz Antonio Rebello da Sylva
Alvaro Xavier da Fonseca Coutinho e Povoas
Luiz Monteiro
João Alexandrino de Sousa Queiroga
Felix Avelar Brotero
Hermano José Braancamp do Sobral
Francisco Antonio dos Santos
Henrique Xavier Baeta
José Ferrão de Mendonça e Sousa
João Maria Soares Castello Branco
Francisco de Paula Travassos
Manoel Agostinho Madeira Torres
Manoel Antonio de Carvalho
Francisco Xavier Monteiro
Manoel Borges Carneiro
José Carlos Coelho Carneiro Pacheco

Representatives from Brazil in the Cortes
(Based on the "Lista Nominal dos Deputados do Brasil à Assembleia Constituinte de Lisboa de 1821 a 1823").

Alagoas Province
Manuel Marques Grangeiro
Francisco de Assis Barbosa
Francisco Manuel Martins Ramos

Amazonas Province
João Lopes da Cunha

Bahia Province
Cipriano Barata
Alexandre Gomes de Argolo Ferrão
Marcos Antônio de Sousa
Pedro Rodrigues Bandeira
José Lino dos Santos Coutinho
Domingos Borges de Barros
Luís Paulino de Oliveira Pinto da França
Francisco Agostinho Gomes
Luís José de Barros Leite

Ceará Province
Antônio José Moreira
Manuel do Nascimento Castro e Silva
José Martiniano Pereira de Alencar
Pedro José da Costa Barros

Espírito Santo Province
João Fortunato Ramos dos Santos

Goiás Province
Joaquim Teotônio Segurado

Maranhão Province
Joaquim Vieira Belford
José João Beckman e Caldas

Minas Gerais Province

Belchior Pinheiro de Oliveira
Manuel Ferreira da Câmara Bittencourt Aguiar e Sá
José Teixeira da Fonseca Vasconcelos
Manuel Rodrigues da Costa
Estêvão Ribeiro de Resende
José Alves do Couto Saraiva
Jacinto Furtado de Mendonça
João Severiano Maciel da Costa
Lucas Antônio Monteiro de Barros
José de Resende Costa (son)
Teotônio Alves de Oliveira Maciel
Antônio Teixeira da Costa
José de Oliveira Pinto Botelho e Mosqueira
Manuel Veloso Soares
João Gomes da Silveira Mendonça
José Joaquim da Rocha
Francisco Pereira de Santa Apolônia
João Evangelista de Faria Lobato
José Antônio da Silva Maia
Lúcio Soares Teixeira de Gouveia
Antônio da Rocha Froes
Cândido José de Araújo Viana
Antônio Gonçalves Gomide
Domingos Alves de Oliveira Maciel
José Custódio Dias
João Gomes da Silveira Mendonça
Francisco de Paula Pereira Duarte
José Cesário de Miranda Ribeiro
José Elói Ottoni

Pará Province
Romualdo de Sousa Coelho
Romualdo Antônio de Seixas
Francisco de Sousa Moreira

Paraíba Province
Francisco Xavier Monteiro de França
José da Costa Cirne

Pernambuco Province

Domingos Malaquias de Aguiar Pires Ferreira
Gervásio Pires Ferreira
Inácio Pinto de Almeida Castro
Félix José Tavares de Lira
Manuel Zeferino dos Santos
Pedro de Araújo Lima
João Ferreira da Silva
Francisco Muniz Tavares
Antônio de Pádua Vieira Cavalcanti (alternate)
Francisco Xavier de Lossio e Seiblitz (alternate)
Manuel Félix de Veras

Piauí Province
Domingos da Conceição 
Manuel de Sousa Borges Leal

Rio de Janeiro Province
Custódio Gonçalves Ledo
João Soares de Lemos Brandão
Francisco Lemos de Faria Pereira Coutinho
José Joaquim da Cunha Azeredo Coutinho
Luis Martins Bastos
Joaquim Gonçalves Ledo
Francisco Vilela Barbosa
Luis Nicolau Fagundes Varela

Rio Grande do Sul Province
João de Santa Bárbara
José Martins Zimblão (alternate)
José Saturnino da Costa Pereira

Santa Catarina Province
Lourenço Rodrigues de Andrade
José da Silva Mafra (alternate)

São Paulo Province
Antônio Carlos Ribeiro de Andrada (did not sign or swear an oath to the 1822 constitution)
Nicolau Pereira de Campos Vergueiro (did not sign or swear an oath to the 1822 constitution)
José Ricardo da Costa Aguiar de Andrada (did not sign or swear an oath to the 1822 constitution)
Diogo Antônio Feijó (did not sign or swear an oath to the 1822 constitution)
José Feliciano Fernandes Pinheiro (signed and swore an oath to the 1822 constitution)
Antônio Manuel da Silva Bueno (alternate; did not sign or swear an oath to the 1822 constitution)
Antônio Pais de Barros (did not take his seat)
Francisco de Paula Sousa e Melo (did not attend)

Brazilian representatives who approved the constitution
On 23 September 1822 the constitution was approved. Among those voting in favour were 36 Brazilian representatives, including 25 from the northeast. This did not include the Brazilians who had abandoned the Cortes, like Cipriano Barata and Antônio Carlos de Andrada e Silva.

Alexandre Gomes de Argolo Ferrão, Bahia
Antônio José Moreira, Ceará
Domingos Borges de Barros, Bahia
Custódio Gonçalves Ledo, Rio de Janeiro
Domingos da Conceição, Piauí
Domingos Malaquias de Aguiar Pires Ferreira, Pernambuco
Félix José Tavares de Lira, Pernambuco
Francisco de Assis Barbosa, Alagoas
Francisco Manuel Martins Ramos, Alagoas
Francisco Moniz Tavares, Pernambuco
Francisco de Sousa Moreira, Pará
Francisco Vilela Barbosa, Rio de Janeiro
Francisco Xavier Monteiro de França, Paraíba
Inácio Pinto de Almeida Castro, Pernambuco
João Ferreira da Silva, Pernambuco
João Lopes da Cunha, Rio Negro (Amazonas)
João Soares de Lemos Brandão, Rio de Janeiro
Joaquim Teotônio Segurado, Goiás
José da Costa Cirne, Paraíba
José João Beckman e Caldas, Maranhão
José Lino dos Santos Coutinho, Bahia
José Martiniano Pereira de Alencar, Ceará
José Feliciano Fernandes Pinheiro, São Paulo
Lourenço Rodrigues de Andrade, Santa Catarina
Luis Martins Bastos, Rio de Janeiro
Luiz Nicolau Fagundes Varella, Rio de Janeiro
Manuel Filippe Gonçalves, Ceará
Manuel Felix de Veras, Pernambuco
Manuel Marques Grangeiro, Alagoas
Manuel do Nascimento Castro e Silva, Ceará
Manuel Zeferino dos Santos, Pernambuco
Marcos Antônio de Sousa, Bahia
Miguel Sousa Borges Leal, Piauí
Pedro de Araújo Lima, Pernambuco
Pedro Rodrigues Bandeira, Bahia
Romualdo de Sousa Coelho, (Bishop) Pará

References

1820 establishments in Portugal
1822 disestablishments in Portugal
Political history of Portugal
Political history of Brazil
Constituent assemblies
History of Lisbon